Joseph Boskin is professor emeritus of history and ethnic and urban studies at Boston University. His interests include American social history, popular culture, ethnicity, conflict and violence, and humor research.

Education and work
B.A., State University of New York at Oswego, 1947-1951
M.A., New York University, 1951-1952
Ph.D., University of Minnesota, 1954-1959 
He has been with Boston University since 1969. 

Other professional associations include Director, Institute on Law and Urban Studies, Los Angeles, 1970-1971 and Editorial board of the International Journal of Humor Research.

April Fools Day history
Associated Press were fooled in 1983 when Boskin provided an "explanation" for the origins of April Fools' Day. After being pressed by a reporter, he invented the story that the practice originated in Emperor Constantine's period, when a group of court jesters jocularly told the emperor that jesters could do a better job of running the empire, and the amused emperor nominated a jester, Kugel, to be the king for a day. Boskin related how the jester passed an edict calling for absurdity on that day and the custom became an annual event. Boskin explained the jester's role as being able to put serious matters into perspective with humor. This story was picked up by other newspapers until the hoax was revealed later.

Books
Author
2011: Corporal Boskin's Cold Cold War: A Comical Journey
A historically accurate personal account of Boskin's stay at the American military base in Greenland where he was involved in a study to build a new base there in 1953. Boskin was involved with the Transportation Arctic Group (TRARG), a top-secret, scientific, expeditionary group stationed at Thule Air Force Base. 

1997: Rebellious Laughter: People's Humor in American Culture
1986: Sambo: The Rise and Demise of an American Jester
The book was written when Boskin was professor of history and Afro-American studies at Boston University. A book review in The New York Times was mostly positive, with reviewer's major disagreement being with Boskin's argument that the mask of "Sambo  the entertainer" contributed to marginalization of African American culture: "But it is Mr. Boskin's insistence on the old image of blacks as crushed victims to which I object most seriously".
1979: Humor and social change in twentieth-century America
1976: Into slavery: Racial decisions in the Virginia Colony
1969: (with Fred Krinsky) The Oppenheimer Affair: A Political Play in Three Acts
Editor
1968: (editor) Opposition Politics: the Anti-New Deal Tradition
1969: (co-editor, author) Protest in the Sixties, Co-editor and Author 1969
1972: (co-ed. with Robert A. Rosenstone, author) Seasons of Rebellion: Protest and Radicalism in Recent America
1976: (editor, author) Urban Racial Violence in the Twentieth Century
1978: (editor, author) Issues in American Society, Editor and Author
1997: (editor, author) The Humor Prism in 20th-century America

References

Year of birth missing (living people)
Living people
American historians
Humor researchers
Boston University faculty
New York University alumni
University of Minnesota alumni
State University of New York at Oswego alumni